John Baker White (12 August 1902 – 10 December 1988) started his career as a political activist and became a director of a private organisation dedicated to fighting left-wing subversion. He became an amateur spy in Nazi Germany before becoming a propaganda agent during World War II. In 1945, he was elected a Conservative politician. He was also a journalist and author and his work reveals a colourful, possibly, eccentric personality.

Career
Baker White graduated from Malvern College in 1920. In the early 1920s he was a member of the Anti-Socialist Union and was part of a tendency within that group that sought to co-operate with the British Fascists. He then worked for the Economic League, a privately funded anti-Communist pressure group and intelligence organization, serving as its Director from 1926 to 1939. Immediately before the war, he spent time in Germany as a spy; accepted there as an ardent anti-communist, he was invited to attend the Nuremberg Rally of 1937; he wrote about this experience in Dover-Nürnberg, Return. After publicly exposing Nazi propaganda and fifth column activity, he was obliged to slip out of Germany in April 1939.

In the early days of World War II, he joined Section D. He was a leading figure in Britain's propaganda campaign, including attempts to convince German soldiers of a failed German landing attempt along the south coast of England. The job of Baker White and of his handful of co-workers was to cook up stories to be fed to the enemy and give him a quite false impression of the state of Britain's defences. Writing in 1955, he recalled his wartime experiences in The Big Lie.

He was elected Member of Parliament for Canterbury in the 1945 general election and served until 1953, when he left Parliament through the method of becoming Steward of the Manor of Northstead. The subsequent by-election was won by Leslie Thomas.

He was also chair of The Freedom Association in Kent and he published four autobiographical books: It's Gone for Good, The Big Lie, Sabotage is Suspected and True Blue.

Publications

 "Red Russia Arms", Burrup Mathieson, 1932
 "The Innocents' Clubs" (pamphlet), John Baker White, 1935
 "Dover-Nürnberg, Return", Burrup Mathieson, 1937
 "The Red Network", International Anti-Communist Entente, 1939
 "Its gone for Good", Vacher & Sons, 1941
 "A Soldier Dares to Think", Vacher, 1942
 "Nationalisation: Chaos or Cure?", Forum Books, 1946
 "The Soviet Spy System", Falcon Press, 1948
 "The Big Lie", Evans Bros, 1955
 "Pattern for Conquest [On Russian intrigue and espionage in Europe since 1945]", Robert Hale, 1956
 "Sabotage is Suspected", Evans Bros, 1957
 "True Blue", Frederick Muller, 1970

References

Notes

General references

External links
 
Profile: Sir George Makgill, Journal of Parapolitics, pp 26–28.
Select Bibliography: Economic League Documents published, Spies at Work, Mike Hughes, 1994.
Spies at Work, Michael Hughes, 1994  (cf Chapters 3, 4, 5 & 6). Printed version: The ISBN in the document and at its publisher (0-948995-05-3) is bad—it causes a checksum error. 
Spies at work: the rise & fall of The Economic League, Michael Hughes, Edition 2, 1995. Printed version , .

1902 births
1988 deaths
Conservative Party (UK) MPs for English constituencies
British anti-communists
People educated at Malvern College
UK MPs 1945–1950
UK MPs 1950–1951
UK MPs 1951–1955
Politics of Canterbury
People educated at Stubbington House School